Valli Vara Pora is a 1995 Indian Tamil-language comedy film directed by S. V. Solai Raja in his debut. The film stars Pandiarajan, Mohana and Nirosha, with Vinu Chakravarthy, Vijaya Lalitha, Vennira Aadai Moorthy, Charle, Muralikumar, Pasi Narayanan and Kumarimuthu playing supporting roles. It is a remake of the Malayalam film Meleparambil Anveedu. The film was released on 10 February 1995,  and failed at the box office.

Plot

Meenakshi and Ayyasamy have three sons : Periyapandi, Thangapandi and Chinnapandi. The three brothers are bachelors, Chinnapandi is the only graduate of his family. Kavitha, a relative, is in love with Chinnapandi but Chinnapandi has no feelings towards her. Chinnapandi sets out for a Kerala village to work as manager of a courier company. There, he meets a Kerala woman named Pavalam, she falls in love with him but her father Menon wants Pavalam to get married against her will. Chinnapandi and Pavalam fall in love with each other and they try to elope from the village, unfortunately, the villagers finally catch them. Menon, the village chief, accepts for their marriage and both get married. Later, that same day, he learns of his transfer to his native village. Chinnapandi is afraid of whether or not his parents would agree to their marriage, so he keeps Pavalam undercover as a maid in his home. His brothers Periyapandi and Thangapandi fall in love with Pavalam. What transpires next forms the rest of the story.

Cast

Pandiarajan as Chinnapandi
Mohana as Pavalam
Nirosha as Kavitha
Vinu Chakravarthy as Menon
Vijaya Lalitha as Meenakshi
Vennira Aadai Moorthy as Ayyasamy
Charle as Thangapandi
Muralikumar as Periyapandi
Pasi Narayanan as Narayanan
Kumarimuthu as Postman
Bhavani Prasad
Usha Nayar
Manager Cheena as Marriage broker
Karikalan
Idichapuli Selvaraj
Sundaram
Appadurai

Soundtrack
The music was composed by K. S. Mani Oli, with lyrics by Piraisoodan, Pattukottai Shanmugasundaram and Ramadaasan.

Reception
Thulasi of Kalki wrote the director's debut film has taken off impressively, so hats off.

References

External links 
 

1990s Tamil-language films
1995 comedy films
1995 directorial debut films
1995 films
Indian comedy films
Tamil remakes of Malayalam films